Coaching career 
Rugby Club Libournais: Forwards Coach 
2020-2022

Cameron Pierce (born 26 October 1991) is a rugby union lock who plays for Pau and Canada. Pierce made his debut for Canada in 2013.

Career

Following an impressive campaign at the 2011 Junior World Trophy, scoring two tries, Pierce was offered a two-year academy deal with Clermont-Auvergne. From 2011 to 2013 Pierce made appearances for the Clermont Espoirs squad. Ahead of the 2013–14 season, Pierce signed a contract with Pau, playing in the French second division. At the end of the 2014–15 season Pau won promotion to the Top 14, the premier French league. Pierce would continue to play with the club appearing in seven matches for Pau's 2015–16 season. However, despite his contract not expiring until the end of the 2016–17 season, Pierce left the team early citing multiple concussion issues.

References

External links

Living people
Canadian rugby union players
1991 births
Canada international rugby union players
Rugby union locks